Panus is a genus of fungi in the family Polyporaceae.

Species
 (Senthil. & S.K.Singh) Senthil. (2015)
Panus bacillisporus Kauffman (1930)
Panus bartlettii Massee (1907)
Panus biersianus Har. & Pat. (1914)
Panus brunneipes Corner (1981)
Panus caespiticola (Pat. & Har.) Drechsler-Santos & Wartchow (2012)
Panus ciliatus (Lév.) T.W.May & A.E.Wood (1995)
Panus conchatus (Bull.) Fr. (1838)
Panus conglomeratus Lloyd (1922)
Panus convivalis Corner (1981)
Panus domicola Speg. (1909)
Panus fasciatus (Berk) Pegler (1965)
Panus hirtiformis (Murrill) Drechsler-Santos & Wartchow (2012)
Panus hookerianus (Berk.) T.W.May & A.E.Wood (1995)
Panus incandescens Berk. & Broome (1883)
Panus indicus Sathe & J.T. Daniel (1981)
Panus japonicus (Yasuda) Yasuda (1922)
Panus johorensis Corner (1981)
Panus kinabaluensis Corner (1981)
Panus luteolus Massee (1902)
Panus maculatus Berk. (1855)
Panus meruliceps Peck (1906)
Panus murinus Bres. (1915)
Panus neostrigosus Drechsler-Santos & Wartchow (2012)
Panus piceus Velen. (1930)
Panus piperatus Beeli (1928)
Panus pruni Velen. (1920)
Panus punctaticeps (Berk. & Broome) T.W.May & A.E.Wood (1995)
Panus purpuratus G.Stev. (1964)
Panus pusillus Velen. (1930)
Panus ramosus Métrod (1946)
Panus semirudis Singer (1936)
Panus setiger (Lév.) Teng (1963)
Panus similis (Berk. & Broome) T.W.May & A.E.Wood (1995)
Panus solomonensis Corner (1981)
Panus strigellus (Berk.) Overh. (1930)
Panus tahitensis Reichardt (1866)
Panus tephroleucus (Mont.) T.W.May & A.E.Wood (1995)
Panus vetustus  Corner (1981)

References

Polyporaceae
Polyporales genera
Taxa named by Elias Magnus Fries
Taxa described in 1838
Bioluminescent fungi